Edith Weston Priory was a small alien house of Benedictine monks in Edith Weston, Rutland. The French parent house of Abbey of Saint-Georges, Boscherville was founded by Ralf de Tanquerville, chamberlain to William the Conqueror, about the year 1050. By 1114 his son William donated the church and manor at Edith Weston, and a small cell of monks was set up to collect the rents and intercede for the founder's soul.

The cell was one of two in England: William founded Avebury Priory in Wiltshire around the same time. Like all alien houses, control (and revenues) passed to the Crown in time of war with France, and it was during one of these periods that the priory closed. The last known Prior was in 1361, and by 1394 the church and manor had been sold to St. Anne's Priory, Coventry, bringing the priory to an end.

Pevsner was dismissive of the priory, saying that Brooke Priory was the only monastery in Rutland as "Edith Weston hardly counts as one".

The earthwork remains probably now lie below the waters of Rutland Water.

Priors of Edith Weston
Only a few names are known:
 John, 1295–1298
 Hugh de Altifago, 1324–1326
 Robert de Cunebaud, 1339–1355
 William de Beauvey, 1355
 Robert, 1361
 John, 1375, 1379
Robert de Cunebaud is known as a delinquent whose abuses were used to justify widespread suspicion of alien cells

References

Monasteries in Rutland
Benedictine monasteries in England
12th-century establishments in England
Christian monasteries established in the 12th century